is a public junior college in Kurashiki, Okayama, Japan, established in 1974. The predecessor of the school was founded in 1968.

External links
 Official website 

Japanese junior colleges
Educational institutions established in 1968
Public universities in Japan
Universities and colleges in Okayama Prefecture